Kailasa Venkata Ramiah (20 October 1926 – 17 December 1994) was an educationist  from Andhra Pradesh, India. He was born in Pegallapadu village of Khammam district. He stood first-in-first in both B.Sc and M.Sc from Osmania University and grew to head the Physics Department of Osmania University. He is recipient of the Sir Akbar Hyderi Gold medal and several awards during his career both as student and later as an academician. He finished his PhD in record time and later his research was in quantum mechanics and Raman effect. He published about 100 papers in both national and international journals. He served to become the first vice-chancellor of Kakatiya University (1976–79). He founded the University from its inception. It was his vision and efforts that led to the development of Kakatiya University in a short period of time.

He is the first person from the present Telangana  to be the member of Union Public Service Commission during the period 1981-87. He also served on Satish Chandra panel for review on UPSC (Civil Services) selection process.

Positions held
1) Lecturer, Physics, Nizam College

2) Principal, Arts & Science college, Warangal

3) First Principal and Special Officer, P.G. Centre, Warangal

4) Head, Physics Department, Osmania University, Hyderabad

5) Director, P.G. Centre, Warangal

6) First Vice-Chancellor, Kakatiya University, Warangal

7) Member, Union Public Service Commission, New Delhi

Achievements and governing bodies
1) Fellow of AP Akademy of Sciences

2) Editorial board member of Indian Journal of Physics

3) Best Teachers AP Award

4) Syndicate Member Osmania University

5) Governing Body, Vasavi College of Engineering, Hyderabad

6) Founder board member of Education Consultants of India Ltd.

7) Expert member of various committees of University Grants Commission of India

8) Governing Body of Mahbub College, Secunderabad

9) President, Lions Club of Secunderabad

References

External links
Kakatiya University official site  Kakatiya University, Warangal-506009, Telangana, India.
LIST OF FORMER CHAIRMEN AND MEMBERS OF THE COMMISSION | UPSC LIST OF FORMER CHAIRMEN AND MEMBERS OF THE COMMISSION | UPSC

1926 births
1994 deaths
Scientists from Andhra Pradesh
People from Khammam district
20th-century Indian educational theorists
Osmania University alumni
Academic staff of Osmania University
Kakatiya University